"Bitch Please", also known as "Trick Please" for the amended radio version, or "B**** Please" and "B Please" for clean versions, is a song by Snoop Dogg featuring Nate Dogg and Xzibit from his fourth album, No Limit Top Dogg. Its music video was directed by Dr. Dre and Phillip Atwell. A sequel song, "Bitch Please II", was for Eminem's third studio album, The Marshall Mathers LP and featured all previous artists in addition to Dr. Dre and Eminem.

There were three edited versions of the song based on the content with radio stations to choose between playing "Trick Please" or the edited version of "Bitch Please", one had amended lyrics, and another had the profanity muted as well as the sex moaning background sound and the second half of the word "doggystyle"  in Snoop Dogg's 2nd verse. In addition, the original clean album version had the profanity backmasked since "Trick Please" wasn't released until The Best of Snoop Dogg album in 2006.

Charts

Weekly charts

Year-end charts

Notes 

Nate Dogg songs
Snoop Dogg songs
Xzibit songs
1999 songs
1999 singles
Song recordings produced by Dr. Dre
Songs written by Snoop Dogg
Gangsta rap songs
G-funk songs
Songs written by Nate Dogg
Songs written by Xzibit
No Limit Records singles